George Watters (26 September 1904 – 1980) was a Scottish miner and labourer from Prestonpans, East Lothian. He fought in the Spanish Civil War and Second World War.

Watters was barred from working in the local pit as he was seen as an agitator and trouble maker following the 1926 General Strike and ensuing lock-out.

Watters opposed the British Union of Fascists and held left-wing views. He attended a rally of the group held at Usher Hall in Edinburgh in 1936, interrupting the meeting by singing The Internationale which started a fight. Watters was arrested and fined for doing so.

Watters served in the International Brigade during the Spanish Civil War, departing for Spain in November 1936. He was captured by nationalist troops at Jarama on 13 February 1937. He was sentenced to indefinite solitary confinement by Franco's troops. When complaints were raised about a condemned prisoner's treatment, the guards told them to take the condemned prisoner's place if they objected. Watters volunteered and was scheduled to be executed three days later, but was spared. His brother-in-law William Dickson was killed at the Battle of Brunete. Watters's family believed he was dead until footage of his repatriation was shown on a news reel.

George Watters also went on to fight in the Second World War and died in 1980. He had a wife, Ellen, and three children.

In 2019, Watters was the subject of 549: Scots of the Spanish Civil War, a play about his role in the Spanish Civil War. A stained glass window with a dedication to Watters was installed in the Prestonpans Labour Club in June 2021.

Notes

1904 births
1980 deaths
Spanish Civil War prisoners of war
British people of the Spanish Civil War
International Brigades personnel
People from Prestonpans
British military personnel of World War II